Cape St. George is a headland and community of the same name, located at the southwestern tip of the Port au Port Peninsula on the Canadian island of Newfoundland.

The headland marks the northwestern limit of St. George's Bay.

The town is associated with the Franco-Newfoundlander and Mi'kmaq community, and may also be referred to as Cap Saint-Georges in French. In addition to the main townsite of Cape St. George itself, the municipal boundaries also encompass the settlements of Petit Jardin, Grand Jardin, De Grau, Red Brook, Loretto and Marches Point. Boutte du Cap Park is also included within the town's boundaries.

Demographics 

References

External links

Populated coastal places in Canada
St. George
Towns in Newfoundland and Labrador